Heather Butler (born November 7, 1993) is an American professional basketball player and coach. In 2019, she won the Icelandic championship and the Icelandic Cup with Valur. She previously played in the WNBA for the San Antonio Stars.

College career
Butler played college basketball for Tennessee-Martin, helping the school to four Ohio Valley Conference titles. She finished her career as the top scorer in UT Martin and Ohio Valley Conference history with 2,865 points which ranked 16th on the NCAA's all-time leaderboard. She was named the 2014 OVC Player of the Year, and ranked ninth in the country in scoring with 23.6 points per game. She scored in double figures in 129 consecutive games, every game of her career, ranking as the second longest streak in NCAA history, and tied a then NCAA three-point record with 392 career three-pointers made.

UT Martin statistics

Source

Professional career
After going undrafted in the 2014 WNBA draft, Butler signed a training camp contract with the San Antonio Stars. She went on to appear in 11 games for the Stars during the 2014 season. In July 2014, Butler signed Polish club MKK Siedlce.

In 2016, Butler participated in the Connecticut Sun training camp.

She joined Uppsala Basket of the Swedish Basketligan dam in January 2017 where she went on to average 21.7 points in 14 games. She returned to Uppsala for the 2017–2018 season and averaged 21.9 points and 5.1 assists per game in 22 games.

In November 2018, Butler signed with Valur of the Icelandic Úrvalsdeild kvenna, replacing Brooke Johnson. On 16 February 2019, she won the Icelandic Cup after Valur defeated Stjarnan in the Cup finals, 74–90. In the game, Butler had 15 points and 8 assists. On 27 April 2019, she helped Valur win its first ever national championship after beating Keflavík in the Úrvalsdeild finals 3-0. In 29 regular season and playoffs games, Butler averaged 21.9 points, 4.9 rebounds and 4.4 assists per game.

Coaching career
In 2015, Butler was hired as an assistant coach at Tennessee-Martin.

References

External links
WNBA profile at wnba.com
Icelandic statistics at kki.is
Swedish statistics at basket.se

1991 births
Living people
American expatriate basketball people in Iceland
American women's basketball players
Úrvalsdeild kvenna basketball players
Valur women's basketball players
Guards (basketball)
21st-century American women